SS Dakotan was a cargo ship built in 1912 for the American-Hawaiian Steamship Company that served as a transport ship in the United States Army Transport Service in World War I, and then was transferred to the Soviet Union under Lend-Lease in World War II before being finally scrapped in 1969. During World War I, she was taken over by the United States Army as USAT Dakotan. Near the end of that war she was transferred to the United States Navy and commissioned as USS Dakotan (ID-3882). During World War II, the ship was transferred to the Soviet Union and renamed SS Zyrianin (or Зырянин in Cyrillic).

Dakotan was built by the Maryland Steel Company as one of eight sister ships for the American-Hawaiian Steamship Company, and was employed in inter-coastal service via the Isthmus of Tehuantepec and the Panama Canal after it opened. During World War I, as USAT Dakotan, the ship carried cargo and animals to France. Dakotan was in the first American convoy to sail to France after the United States entered the war in April 1917. In Navy service, USS Dakotan carried cargo to France and returned over 8,800 American troops after the Armistice.

After her Navy service ended in 1919, she was returned to her original owners and resumed relatively uneventful cargo service over the next twenty years. Dakotan ran aground off the coast of Mexico in 1923 but was freed and towed to port for repairs. Early in World War II, the ship was requisitioned by the War Shipping Administration and transferred to the Soviet Union under the terms of Lend-Lease in December 1942. Sailing as SS Zyrianin, the ship remained a part of the Soviet merchant fleet into the late 1960s.

Design and construction
The contract cost of the ships was set at the construction cost plus an 8% profit for Maryland Steel, but with a maximum cost of $640,000 per ship. The construction was financed by Maryland Steel with a credit plan that called for a 5% down payment in cash with nine monthly installments for the balance. The deal had provisions that allowed some of the nine installments to be converted into longer-term notes or mortgages. The final cost of Dakotan, including financing costs, was $66.00 per deadweight ton, which totaled just under $672,000.

Dakotan (Maryland Steel yard no. 125) was the second ship built under the original contract. She was launched on 10 August 1912, and delivered to American-Hawaiian in November. The steamer had accommodations for 18 officers, 40 crewmen, and could carry up to 16 passengers.

Early career
When Dakotan began sailing for American-Hawaiian, the company shipped cargo from East Coast ports via the Tehuantepec Route to West Coast ports and Hawaii, and vice versa. Shipments on the Tehuantepec Route arrived at Mexican ports—Salina Cruz, Oaxaca, for eastbound cargo, and Coatzacoalcos for westbound cargo—and traversed the Isthmus of Tehuantepec on the Tehuantepec National Railway. Eastbound shipments were primarily sugar and pineapple from Hawaii, while westbound cargoes were general in nature. Dakotan sailed in this service on the east side of North America.

At the time of the United States occupation of Veracruz on 21 April 1914, Dakotan was in port at Coatzacoalcos. There she loaded 127 American refugees from sugar plantations in the area and steamed to Veracruz. As a consequence of the American action, the Huerta-led Mexican government closed the Tehuantepec National Railway to American shipping.

In early May, The New York Times reported that Dakotan had sailed to Cristóbal to pick up a cargo of sugar that had been originally slated for transport via Tehuantepec. According to the article, the sugar was to be carried on barges through the still-unopened Panama Canal, then loaded onto Dakotan. There was no indication in the newspaper whether this mission was completed or not, but it is known that American-Hawaii returned to its historic route of sailing cargo around South America via the Straits of Magellan after Tehuantepec was closed but before the canal opened.

With the opening of the Panama Canal on 15 August, American-Hawaiian ships switched to using the canal. In early September, American-Hawaiian announced that Dakotan would sail on a route from New York via the canal to San Francisco and on to either Seattle or Tacoma. When landslides closed the canal in October 1915, all American-Hawaiian ships, including Dakotan, returned to the Straits of Magellan route.

In 1916, Dakotan was one of several American-Hawaiian cargo ships chartered by the DuPont Nitrate Company to carry sodium nitrate from Chile to the United States. Dakotan and the other cargo ships in this South American service would typically deliver loads of coal, gasoline, or steel in exchange for the sodium nitrate. In May, The Christian Science Monitor reported on what may have been a typical delivery for Dakotan. The ship had left Tocopilla with 91,872 bags—about —of sodium nitrate for use in making explosives, and, after transiting the newly reopened Panama Canal, arrived in Philadelphia.

World War I
After the United States declared war on Germany in April 1917, the United States Army, needing transports to move its men and materiel to France, convened a select committee of shipping executives who pored over registries of American shipping to evaluate transport capabilities. The committee selected Dakotan, her sister ship Montanan, and twelve other American-flagged ships that were sufficiently fast, could carry enough fuel in their bunkers for transatlantic crossings, and, most importantly, were in port or not far at sea. After Dakotan discharged her last load of cargo, she was officially handed over to the Army on 29 May.

Before troop transportation began, all of the ships were hastily refitted. Of the fourteen ships, four, including Dakotan and Montanan, were designated to carry animals and cargo; the other ten were designated to carry human passengers. Ramps and stalls were built on the four ships chosen to carry animals. Gun platforms were installed on each ship before it docked at the Brooklyn Navy Yard, where the guns were put in place. All the ships were manned by merchant officers and crews but carried military personnel: two U.S. Navy officers, Navy gun crews, quartermasters, signalmen, and wireless operators. The senior Navy officer on board would take control if a ship came under attack.

Dakotan departed with her group on the morning of 17 June for Brest, France, steaming at an  pace. A thwarted submarine attack on the first convoy group, and reports of heavy submarine activity off of Brest resulted in a change in the convoy's destination to Saint-Nazaire.

Dakotan departed Saint-Nazaire on 14 July in the company of her convoy mates El Occidente, Montanan, and Edward Luckenbach. Joining the return trip were Army transport , Navy armed collier , Navy oiler , and cruiser , the flagship of Rear Admiral Albert Gleaves, the head of the Navy's Cruiser and Transport Force.

Sources do not reveal Dakotans movements over the next months, but on 6 September 1917, the Naval Armed Guardsmen aboard Dakotan shelled a German submarine after its periscope had been sighted. On 29 January 1919, Dakotan was transferred to the Navy and commissioned the same day. Outfitted for service as a troop transport to return American servicemen from Europe, Dakotan made five transatlantic roundtrips to France as part of the Navy's Cruiser and Transport Force between 15 February and 20 July. Eastbound journeys delivered cargo to Saint-Nazaire and Bordeaux for the Army of Occupation; westbound trips returned soldiers to the United States. Dakotan carried a total of 8,812 troops on her five westbound voyages. Dakotan returned from her final voyage on 20 July, was decommissioned at New York on 31 July, and returned to American-Hawaiian the same day.

Interwar years
Dakotan resumed cargo service with American-Hawaiian after her return from World War I service. Although the company had abandoned its original Hawaiian sugar routes, Dakotan continued inter-coastal service through the Panama Canal in a relatively uneventful manner over the next twenty years. One incident of note occurred on 20 August 1923 when Dakotan issued distress calls after she ran aground at Cabo San Lázaro on the Pacific coast of Mexico. The Navy transport ship  and the Standard Oil tanker Charles Pratt responded to Dakotans calls. Charles Pratt successfully freed Dakotan, which had suffered damage to her rudder post in the accident. The American-Hawaiian ship Nevadan arrived and towed Dakotan to Los Angeles for repairs.

In 1933, two members of Dakotans crew had medical emergencies that received news coverage. The first, in February, involved a seaman with an abdominal disorder. He was transferred from the eastbound Dakotan to the Dollar Line ocean liner  which carried him to Los Angeles to receive medical attention. The second occurred in July when Dakotans quartermaster came down with appendicitis near Balboa. Radio calls for assistance brought the U.S. Navy's Destroyer Division 7 to Dakotans aid. The destroyer unit's medical officer boarded Dakotan and performed an appendectomy on the man, who was too ill to be moved off the ship.

World War II and later career
After the United States entered World War II, in 1941 - though most of Europe had been involved since summer 1939 - Dakotan was requisitioned by the War Shipping Administration (WSA), but continued to be operated by American-Hawaiian. In December 1942, Dakotan was transferred to the Soviet Union under Lend-Lease, and renamed Zyrianin (Зырянин ). Throughout the rest of the war, Dakotan made at least one trip to the United States, being photographed in port at San Francisco in August 1943. Near the end of World War II, the WSA offered a payment of $670,210 to American-Hawaiian for the former Dakotan as part of a $7.2 million settlement for eleven American-Hawaiian ships that had been requisitioned by the WSA. Zyrianin remained a part of the Soviet merchant fleet through the 1960s, and was listed in Lloyd's Register until the 1970–71 edition.

Zyrianin was operated by the Far East Shipping Company (FESCO) from 1943 to 1957. From 1957, she was operated by the Black Sea Shipping Company. The ship was written off and scrapped at Split, Yugoslavia in 1969.

Notes

References

Bibliography

External links
 
 Engine/engine room photos

Cargo ships of the United States
Ships built in Sparrows Point, Maryland
1912 ships
World War I merchant ships of the United States
World War I auxiliary ships of the United States
Cargo ships of the United States Navy
Unique transports of the United States Navy
World War II merchant ships of the United States
World War II auxiliary ships of the United States
World War II merchant ships of the Soviet Union
Merchant ships of the Soviet Union
Soviet Union–United States relations